Anthony G. Reddie is Director of the Oxford Centre for Religion and Culture at Regent’s Park College, University of Oxford and an Extraordinary Professor of Theological Ethics at the University of South Africa. He is specialising in black theology.

Biography
Reddie was born and raised in Bradford, West Yorkshire from a family of first-generation Caribbean migrants. He undertook tertiary education at the University of Birmingham, first with Bachelor of Arts in History (1987), then with PhD in Education (2000), supervised by John Hull. His PhD thesis was later turned to a monograph in 2003, under the title of Nobodies to Somebodies (Epworth press, 2003). His book SCM Core Text: Black Theology published in 2012 was the first text that examined Black theology through a participative model to investigate how practical theology impacts Black people in inner city, poor communities in Britain.

He is editor of the academic journal Black Theology since 2002 and is a member of the Executive Committee of the Society for the Study of Theology (SST). He received an 'A rating' in the National Research Foundation (NRF) of South Africa as the first Black person to receive this highest rating in theology and religious studies.

He is one of the recipients of the 2020 Lanfranc Award delivered by the Archbishop of Canterbury to recognise his 'exceptional and sustained contribution to Black theology In Britain and beyond'.

Works
 Reddie Anthony G. (2020). Is God Colour-Blind? Insights from Black Theology for Christian Faith and Ministry. London: SPCK. 
 Reddie Anthony G. (2019). Theologising Brexit: A Liberationist and Postcolonial Critique. Abingdon: Taylor and Francis. 
 Reddie Anthony G. (2012). Black Theology. London: SCM Press.

References

Further reading 
 Anthony Reddie's Personal Website

Living people
People from Bradford
Alumni of the University of Birmingham
Fellows of Regent's Park College, Oxford
Decolonization
World Christianity scholars
British theologians
Methodist theologians
Black British academics
Liberation theologians
Year of birth missing (living people)